Brian McGee (born 8 October 1965, Greenock, Scotland) is the 11th Bishop of the Roman Catholic Diocese of Argyll and the Isles in Scotland.

Early life

McGee was born in Greenock to Irish parents Seamus and Brighid McGee, who moved to Scotland after their marriage in 1964.
 He attended St Joseph's Primary School and Holy Cross Primary School, both in Greenock. After primary education he continued his studies at St. Vincent's College, Langbank, and St. Mary's College, Blairs, a minor seminary.

Formation and further studies

McGee studied for the priesthood at St. Patrick's College, Thurles (in County Tipperary, Ireland) between 1983 and 1989, where he received a Certificate in Philosophy (Distinction) validated by the Irish Governments National Council for Educational Awards and a Diploma in Theology (Distinction), accredited by Maynooth Pontifical University. In 2011 he completed a Master of Arts degree in Christian Spirituality (Distinction) from Sarum College, Salisbury.

Priesthood

McGee was ordained in 1989 as a priest for the Diocese of Paisley by Bishop John Mone.

He subsequently held the following pastoral appointments:

 Assistant Priest, St Charles Borromeo Parish, Paisley 1989-1995
 Assistant Priest, Holy Family Parish, Port Glasgow 1995-1997 
 Parish Priest, St Joseph's Parish, Clarkston 1997-2007
 Spiritual Director, Scotus College, National Seminary 2007-2009
 Parish Priest, Holy Family Parish, Port Glasgow 2009-2015

In 2014 he was appointed vicar general of the Diocese of Paisley.

Episcopal career

He was appointed by Pope Francis on 28 December 2015
and consecrated by Archbishop Leo Cushley on 18 February 2016 in St Columba's Cathedral, Oban. Bishops Joseph Toal of Motherwell, McGee's immediate predecessor, and John Keenan, bishop of his native diocese of Paisley, served as co-consecrators.

References

Living people
1965 births
21st-century Roman Catholic bishops in Scotland
Roman Catholic bishops of Argyll and the Isles
People from Greenock
Alumni of Sarum College
Alumni of St. Patrick's College, Thurles
Scottish Roman Catholic bishops
Scottish people of Irish descent